John Frederick Richmond (17 September 1938 — August 2018) was an English footballer who played as a left-half.

Career
In January 1956, Richmond signed for Derby County from local club Derby Corinthians. On 12 April 1958, Richmond made his debut for Derby in a 0–0 draw against Huddersfield Town. Richmond made five further league appearances for the club, with the majority of Richmond's time at the club spent playing for the reserves in the Central League. In June 1963, Richmond joined Chelmsford City, where he stayed until 1965.

References

1938 births
2018 deaths
Association football wingers
English footballers
Footballers from Derby
People educated at Derby School
Derby County F.C. players
Chelmsford City F.C. players
English Football League players